The Diversisporales are an order of generally hypogeous (underground) arbuscular mycorrhizal fungi within the division Glomeromycota. Many have vesicles for energy storage, or auxiliary cells. Species produce a wide range of spore types, hence the name.

References

 
Fungus orders